The High Commissioner of the United Kingdom to Vanuatu is the United Kingdom's diplomatic representative to the Republic of Vanuatu.

As Vanuatu and the United Kingdom are fellow members of the Commonwealth of Nations, diplomatic relations between them are at government level rather than between Heads of State. Thus, the countries exchange High Commissioners rather than ambassadors.

History
In 2005 the British Government closed its High Commission in Port Vila. During this time British interests in Vanuatu were represented by the British High Commissioner to Solomon Islands who was also accredited as High Commissioner to Vanuatu. The British High Commission in Port Vila is to reopened in summer 2019 with a resident High Commissioner.

List of heads of mission

High Commissioners to Vanuatu
1980–1982: William Ashford
1982–1985: Richard Dorman
1985–1988: Malcolm Creek
1988–1992: John Thompson
1992–1995: Thomas Duggin
1995–1997: James Daly
1997–2000: Malcolm Geoffrey Hilson OBE
2000–2005: Michael Hill
2006–2009: Roger Sykes (non-resident)
2009–2011: Malcolm McLachlan (non-resident)
2011–2012: Timothy Smart (acting, non-resident)
2012–2013: Martin Fidler (acting, non-resident)
2013–2016: Dominic Meiklejohn (non-resident)
2016–2019: David Ward (non-resident)

2019–present: Karen Bell

References

Vanuatu
United Kingdom